Mariela Royo Letelier (born 27 September 1982) is a Chilean historian and lawyer who was elected as a member of the Chilean Constitutional Convention.

References

External links
 

Living people
1983 births
21st-century Chilean politicians
Equality Party (Chile) politicians
Members of the Chilean Constitutional Convention
21st-century Chilean women politicians
University of Chile alumni
University of Talca alumni